The 1949 East Carolina Pirates football team was an American football team that represented East Carolina Teachers College (now known as East Carolina University) as a member of the North State Conference during the 1949 college football season. In their first season under head coach Bill Dole, the team compiled a 4–5–1 record.

Schedule

References

East Carolina
East Carolina Pirates football seasons
East Carolina Pirates football